The 2008 United States House of Representatives election in Vermont was held on November 4, 2008 and determined who represents the state of Vermont in the United States House of Representatives. Democratic Congressman Peter Welch decided to run for a second term in Congress, and, in an aberration for a freshman member of Congress, encountered no major-party opposition. Welch defeated a series of independent candidates with ease and represented Vermont in the 111th Congress.

Democratic Primary

Candidates
Peter Welch, incumbent United States Congressman
Craig Hill, perennial candidate and advocate of Vermont secession

Results

Independent candidates
Mike Bethel
Cris Ericson, marijuana activist, perennial candidate
Jerry Trudell, renewable energy activist, pilot, independent candidate for U.S. House in 2006

General election

Results

References

United States House of Representatives
Vermont
2008